Henri Samuel (1904–1996) was one of the foremost French interior designers of the twentieth century, hailed by Architectural Digest as a "supreme master of progressive historicism". He was a leading interpreter of le Goût Rothschild after the Second World War and helped restore Château de Ferrières and Château Lafite in the 1950s. His clients included several members of the Rothschild family, the fashion designer Valentino, and the prominent collector Jayne Wrightsman.

Further reading 
 Eerdmans, Emily Evans. Henri Samuel: Master of the French Interior. New York: Rizzoli, 2018

References 

French interior designers
1904 births
1996 deaths